The 2013 Vanessa Phillips Women's Tournament was a professional tennis tournament played on outdoor hard courts. It was the first edition of the tournament which was part of the 2013 ITF Women's Circuit, offering $75,000 in prize money. It took place in Eilat, Israel, between 28 January and 3 February 2013.

WTA entrants

Seeds 

 1 Rankings are as of 14 January 2013

Other entrants 
The following players received wildcards into the singles main draw:
  Michaela Hončová
  Valeria Patiuk
  Keren Shlomo
  Ekaterina Tour

The following players received entry from the qualifying draw:
  Corinna Dentoni
  Valentyna Ivakhnenko
  Ilona Kremen
  Tereza Smitková

The following player received entry by a Protected Ranking:
  Renata Voráčová

Champions

Singles 

  Elina Svitolina def.  Marta Sirotkina 6–3, 3–6, 7–5

Doubles 

  Alla Kudryavtseva /  Elina Svitolina def.  Corinna Dentoni /  Aliaksandra Sasnovich 6–1, 6–3

External links 
 Official website
 2013 Vanessa Phillips Women's Tournament at ITFtennis.com

Vanessa Phillips women's tournament
Hard court tennis tournaments
Tennis tournaments in Israel
2013 in Israeli women's sport